Wintershall Dea GmbH is a German gas and oil producer. The joint venture was created in May 2019 by the merger between Wintershall Holding GmbH and DEA Deutsche Erdoel AG. BASF SE has a 67% stake in it, with the other 33% being held by LetterOne, whose main ultimate owner is the Russian business magnate Mikhail Fridman.  it was planning listing on the Frankfurt Stock Exchange.

 the company had numerous gas assets in Russia and was a key actor in financing the Nord Stream 2 project, lending substantial sums to the Russian state-owned energy giant Gazprom. On the eve of Russia's invasion of Ukraine in February 2022, DEA advocated against punitive measures on Russia that focused on gas supply and pipelines. When Germany suspended Nord Stream 2 due to Russia's invasion, DEA argued that it should be compensated for its €730 million investment in the pipeline.

Mikhail Fridman, Russian oligarch and prominent enabler of the Vladimir Putin regime in Russia, is a minority shareholder in DEA.

History

Wintershall was founded in 1894 and DEA was founded five years later as Deutsche Tiefbohr-Actiengesellschaft. The two companies began to work together more intensively since the 1950s. 
In 1952, Wintershall and DEA acquired the majority in Deutsche Gasolin AG which later merged with its sister company Aral AG in connection with the construction of the Emsland oil refinery. Another consequence of their collaboration was the joint establishment of Germany's only offshore drilling platform Mittelplate in the Wadden Sea, which began production in 1987.

On 27 September 2018, the respective parent companies of Wintershall, namely BASF and of LetterOne, namely DEA Deutsche Erdoel AG announced the binding contract for the merger of their daughter companies.

In August 2020, Wintershall Dea signed a cooperation memorandum with Sonatrach of Algeria.

Operations
 Wintershall Dea operated in the field of gas and oil exploration and production in 13 countries in Europe, Latin America, the Middle East, North Africa and Russia with headquarters in Kassel and Hamburg.  it employed around 2,800 people worldwide. Its Chief Executive Officer has been Mario Mehren. According to Wintershall DEA’s pro forma figures, revenues and other income amounted to €5.9 billion in 2019.

 Wintershall Dea owned 40% of the Bergknapp prospect. It has also been the operator of the prospect.

Russia
 the company had numerous gas assets in Russia and was a key actor in financing the Nord Stream 2 project, lending substantial sums to the Russian state-owned energy giant Gazprom. On the eve of Russia's invasion of Ukraine in February 2022, DEA advocated against punitive measures on Russia that focused on gas supply and pipelines. When Germany suspended Nord Stream 2 due to Russia's invasion, DEA argued that it should be compensated for its €730 million investment in the pipeline.

Mikhail Fridman, Russian oligarch and prominent enabler of the Vladimir Putin regime in Russia, has been a minority shareholder in DEA.

In January 2023, about one year after the Russian invasion of Ukraine, Wintershall Dea stopped its business operations in Russia with an estimated loss of 1.4 billion Euros. The Russian side had allegedly plundered the bank accounts of partnership projects and the Russian state effectivly seized profits generated since March 2022. Several of Wintershall Deas lost investments in Russia were secured by German government guarantees.

Bibliography 
 Rainer Karlsch, Raymond G. Stokes: Faktor Öl. Die Mineralölwirtschaft in Deutschland 1859-1974. (“The Factor Oil: The Mineral Oil industry in Germany from 1859 to 1974 (German Only)) C. H. Beck, Munich 2003,

References

External links 
 

Oil companies of Germany
Natural gas companies of Germany
BASF